Çullu is a village in the Jabrayil District of Azerbaijan.

History 
The town was located in the Armenian-occupied territories surrounding Nagorno-Karabakh, coming under the control of ethnic Armenian forces on 23 August 1993 during the First Nagorno-Karabakh War. The town subsequently became part of the breakaway Republic of Artsakh as part of its Kashatagh Province, referred to as Lchashen. It was recaptured by Azerbaijan on 28 October 2020 during the Lachin offensive of the 2020 Nagorno-Karabakh war.

References

External links 
 

Populated places in Jabrayil District